is a song by Japanese singer Kazumasa Oda. The song, his best-known work, is featured as the B-side on the single "Oh! Yeah! / Love Story wa Totsuzen ni", the ninth-best-selling Japanese single since 1968, selling approximately 2.7 million copies to date.

History
"Love Story wa Totsuzen ni" was used as the theme song for the popular Fuji TV drama Tokyo Love Story. The song was written, composed, arranged and produced by Oda himself.

The song has since been featured on three of Oda's albums: Oh! Yeah! (1991), Tsutaetai Koto ga arun da (1997) and Jiko Best (2002).

In 2005, fourteen years after the song was released, NHK conducted a survey titled . "Love Story wa Totsuzen ni" was ranked at number forty-four out of one hundred male artists.

Oda performed the song during the 1991 broadcast of the FNS Music Festival, his first solo TV performance since embarking on his solo career. He also performed the song with KinKi Kids on a special edition of the variety programme "Love Love Aishiteru" in 2000.

Sales
The single reached number one on the weekly Japanese music chart, Oricon, charting for forty-four weeks. It was also the best-selling single of 1991, selling 2.54 million copies and beating the number-two seller by just under 40,000 copies.

Covers
"Love Story wa Totsuzen ni" has been covered by many artists, both in Asia and overseas.
Asian covers
Tatsuo Kamon
Twelve Girls Band (instrumental)
Kyōgo Kawaguchi
Anri
Kohmi Hirose
Winnie Hsin (Mandarin as 愛情故事, lit. Love Story)
Hiromi Setoguchi
Ekin Cheng (Cantonese)
Chris Hart
Yuya Matsushita
DEPAPEKO (Depapepe × Kotaro Oshio)

English-language covers
Bobby Kimball
Ned Doheny
Rita Coolidge
Jun'ichi Kanemaru
Debbie Gibson
BENI

Single track-listing

References

1991 songs
Japanese-language songs
Songs written by Kazumasa Oda
Sony Music Entertainment Japan singles
Japanese television drama theme songs